Yia-Chung Chang is a Taiwanese physicist.

Chang studied physics at National Cheng Kung University and completed a doctorate in the same field at the California Institute of Technology. Upon graduating, he joined the University of Illinois at Urbana–Champaign faculty. Chen was elected a fellow of the American Physical Society in 2001. He returned to Taiwan in 2005, as a research fellow at Academia Sinica.

References

Year of birth missing (living people)
Living people
20th-century Taiwanese physicists
21st-century Taiwanese physicists
Taiwanese expatriates in the United States
California Institute of Technology alumni
National Cheng Kung University alumni
University of Illinois Urbana-Champaign faculty
Fellows of the American Physical Society